Chouaya     is a  local authority in  the  Hasbaya District in Lebanon.

History
In 1838, during the Ottoman era, Eli Smith noted the  population of Shuweiya as being Druze and "Greek" Christians.

In 1875 Victor Guérin described it: "Continuing up, I arrive, at six hours forty minutes, at Choueia, another village whose population is similarly composed of Druses and schismatic Greeks. To the east of this village and the plantations of fig trees, vineyards and mulberry trees that surround it, I notice old quarries, which were later transformed into reservoirs, and a little further the remains of a tower antique measuring 12 steps long by 8 wide and built with very considerable blocks, regularly cut. At a short distance from there, several funerary pits dug in the rock are perhaps contemporaneous with this tower, which was intended to protect the road leading on this side to the top of the Great Hermon"

Modern times
After the 1982 invasion Chouaya became part of Israeli Security Zone. On 8 June 1990 a clash occurred in the area in which four members of the Popular Front for the Liberation of Palestine (PFLP) were killed by the South Lebanon Army (SLA).

References

Bibliography

External links
Chouaya (Hasbaiya), Localiban

Populated places in Hasbaya District
Druze communities in Lebanon